Artemus de Almeida (born 9 May 1969) is a Brazilian equestrian. He competed in the individual eventing at the 1996 Summer Olympics.

References

External links
 

1969 births
Living people
Brazilian male equestrians
Olympic equestrians of Brazil
Equestrians at the 1996 Summer Olympics
Equestrians at the 1999 Pan American Games
Pan American Games medalists in equestrian
Pan American Games silver medalists for Brazil
People from Americana, São Paulo
Medalists at the 1999 Pan American Games
Sportspeople from São Paulo (state)
21st-century Brazilian people
20th-century Brazilian people